Synth-pop (also known as electropop or technopop) is a music genre that uses the synthesizer as the dominant musical instrument. With the genre becoming popular in the late 1970s and 1980s, the following article is a list of notable synth-pop acts, listed by the first letter in their name (not including articles such as "a", "an", or "the"). Individuals are listed by last name.

Note: ≈ indicates a member of the Rock and Roll Hall of Fame

A

ABC
Adolphson & Falk
Adult
a-ha
ALB
Alizée
Allie X
Marc Almond
Alphaville
AlunaGeorge
And One
Animotion
Annie
Christopher Anton
Anything Box
ARO
Art of Noise
The Assembly
Au Revoir Simone
Aural Vampire
Aurora
Austra
Ayria

B

Karl Bartos
Bastille
Bastion
Bat for Lashes
Bear in Heaven
Bebi Dol
Beborn Beton
Belanova
Beograd
Berlin
Betty Who
The Bird and the Bee
The Black Queen
Blancmange
B-Movie
Bonanza Banzai
Book of Love
≈David Bowie
Bronski Beat
The Buggles

C

C.C.C.P.
Camouflage
Capital Cities
Capsule
Casiokids
Cause and Effect
Celebrate the Nun
ceo
Chairlift
Charli XCX
Chew Lips
Chicks on Speed
China Crisis
Christine and the Queens
Chromatics
Chromeo
Chvrches
Vince Clarke
Class Actress
Client
Cold Cave
Com Truise
The Communards
Computer Magic
Al Corley
Cosmicity
Crumbächer
Crystal Castles
≈The Cure
Cut Copy

D

Dalek I Love You
Dangerous Muse
D' Boys
Dead or Alive
Delorean
Denis & Denis
≈Depeche Mode
Desire
Deutsch Amerikanische Freundschaft (D.A.F.)
De/Vision
Devo
Thomas Dolby
Donkeyboy
Dragonette
Dubstar
Du Du A
≈Duran Duran
DyE

E

Elegant Machinery
Eleventyseven
Empire of the Sun
Erasure
≈Eurythmics
Exotic Birds

F

The Fallout Club
Harold Faltermeyer
Fan Death
Mylène Farmer
Feathers
Fenech-Soler
Sky Ferreira
A Flock of Seagulls
John Foxx
Frankie Goes to Hollywood
Frankmusik
Freezepop
Freur
Future Islands

G

Gina X Performance
Glass Candy
The Golden Filter
Goldfrapp
Ellie Goulding
Grafton Primary
Great Good Fine Ok
Grimes

H

Paul Haig
Halsey
Paul Hardcastle
Calvin Harris
Imogen Heap
Heaven 17
Holy Ghost!
Hot Chip
The Human League
The Hundred in the Hands
Hurts
Hyperbubble

I

I Am the World Trade Center
I Blame Coco
iamamiwhoami
Icehouse
The Icicle Works
Icona Pop
Ien Oblique
Imperative Reaction
Indochine
Information Society
Iris

J

Japan
Jean Michel Jarre
Jon and Vangelis
Howard Jones
Joy Electric
Julien-K
Junior Boys

K

Kajagoogoo
Kate Boy
Kazaky
Nik Kershaw
Kesha
Kids of 88
The Killers
Kissing the Pink
Kites with Lights
The Knife
Kon Kan
Kozmetika
≈Kraftwerk
Kyary Pamyu Pamyu

L

La Roux
Laboratorija Zvuka
Lady Gaga
Ladyhawke
Ladytron
Laid Back
Lali Puna
Lamb
Laki Pingvini
Landscape
LANY
Level 42
Light Asylum
Lights
Dua Lipa
Little Boots
Little Dragon
Tove Lo

M

M
M83
Madeon
Magdalena Bay
The Magnetic Fields
Mannequin Depressives
Marina and the Diamonds
Helen Marnie
Marsheaux
John Maus
Mecano
Melotron
Javiera Mena
Men Without Hats
Metric
Metro Station
MGMT
Miami Horror
Midnight Juggernauts
Miike Snow
Slađana Milošević
Ministry (early work)
Kylie Minogue
Mirrors
Miss Kittin
MNDR
MØ
Modern Talking
Mœnia
Momus
Monarchy
Giorgio Moroder
Róisín Murphy

N

Yasutaka Nakata
The Naked and Famous
Naked Eyes
NamNamBulu
NASA
Neon Indian
New Musik
New Order
Niagara
Night Club
Niki & The Dove
No Doubt
Gary Numan
NYPC

O

Oh Land
Onetwo
Orchestral Manoeuvres in the Dark
Our Daughter's Wedding
Ou Est le Swimming Pool
Owl City

P

Parallels
Parralox
Passion Pit
Peaches
Perfume
Pet Shop Boys
Phoenix
Plastics
The Postal Service
The Presets
Propaganda
Pseudo Echo
Psyche
Purity Ring
Pvris

Q
The Quick

R

Rational Youth
Re-Flex
Real Life
Red Flag
Porter Robinson
Robots in Disguise
Robyn
Ronika
Röyksopp
Martin Rushent

S

Saint Etienne
Sally Shapiro
Sandra
Say Lou Lou
Scritti Politti
Seona Dancing
Shura
Shy Child
Silicon Teens
Émilie Simon
Simple Minds
Slomljena Stakla
Soft Cell
Sohodolls
Jimmy Somerville
The Sound of Arrows
Space
Spandau Ballet
Sparks
St. Lucia
Stock Aitken Waterman
Swiss Lips

T

Talk Talk
Tears for Fears
Tegan and Sara
The Teenagers
Telex
Tesla Boy
Thompson Twins
Tim & Jean
TM Network
Toro y Moi
Trust

U

Uffie
Ultravox
U Škripcu

V

Van She
Versa (Neon era)
Videosex
Vitamin Z
Visage
Vive la Fête

W

Washed Out
Wet
When in Rome
Wolfsheim

Y

Yazoo
Years & Years
Yelle
Yello
Yellow Magic Orchestra
Young Ejecta

Z

Zana
Zeigeist
Zola Jesus

See also
List of new wave artists
List of post-punk bands
Lists of musicians

References

Bibliography

Synthpop